Boehringer (Böhringer) may refer to:

 Boehringer Ingelheim, a pharmaceutical company
 Boehringer Laboratories, an American medical technology company
 Boehringer Mannheim, a medical supplies company acquired by Roche Diagnostics
 Gebr. Boehringer (:de:Gebr. Boehringer}, original manufacturer of Unimog trucks 
 Brian Boehringer (born 1969), former Major League Baseball pitcher
 Jorge Boehringer, musician from the United States
 Peter Boehringer (born 1969), German politician
 Robert Boehringer (1884–1974), German industrialist and poet
 Moritz Böhringer (born 1993), German American Football player

See also
Bohringer

German-language surnames